Malika Makouf Rasmussen (born 27 February 1965 in Algiers, Algeria) is a Norwegian/Algerian/French composer, musician, music producer, curator and philosopher.

Early life 
Rasmussen was born 1965 in Algiers, Algeria, to Algerian-French-Norwegian parents. Her family left Algeria and stayed in Budapest, Hungary, for a year before in 1970 they ended in Norway. Rasmussen started to play classical guitar at the age nine and later picked up the electric bass. When fifteen she went to stay in Paris for a year with her father. She resided in Fredrikstad after returning to Norway, and was involved in different bands during the following year. She studied music at Sønstevold Institute of Music and at nineteen she graduated from Greåker Music College.

Career 
Rasmussen started her professional career in Paris, France (1985). During this period she was inspired by the creative friction emerging when people of different backgrounds are put together, and she found the way back to what she has described as her roots and began to develop a musical expression within the then new genre termed crossover and world music. When she went to Oslo in the 1990s, she worked as a session musician and initiated several of her own band projects beside studying musical and cultural studies at Telemark University College and the Norwegian Academy of Music, and later pursued a master's degree in philosophy at the  University of Oslo.

She has toured widely in Europe and Africa, and has performed at a number of festivals and concert halls around the world, like the Harare International Music and Film Festival, Olympia Paris, Tune In (Stockholm), Great Bear (New York), Klaverfabriken (Hillerød) and Vanløse Kulturhus (Copenhagen).

Rasmussen has collaborated on numerous recordings and has released four solo albums, Exit Cairo (2006) with guest appearance by Bugge Wesseltoft and Mari Boine, On Club (2008), Urbanized (2010) and So Easy So High (2012).

Honors 
 2009: Gammleng-prisen in the Open category
 2010: Oslo Screen Festival: Honourable Mention for music to the video "The Red City", 2010
 2011: Kardemommestipendiet NOPA

Discography

Solo albums 
 2006: Exit Cairo (New Music)
 2008: On Club (New Music)
 2010: Urbanized (New Music)
 2012: So Easy So High (New Music)

Collaborations 
Selected

With Tabanka Dance Ensemble
2017:  "Limbo" (composer. musician, music producer)

With Mechamnix Films
2017: "The Other Jerusalem" (composer. musician, music producer)

With Kristin Asbjørnsen, Oddrun Lilja Jonsdottir, Luis Landa-Schreitt, Wei Ting Tzeng, Dahir Doni
2017: "Club Montmartre" (composer. musician, band leader)

With Mari Boine
 2006: Idjagieðas (In The Hand of the Night) (Composer)

With Queendom
2002: Queendom (composer. musician, music producer)

With Team Maroon
2003: The R.I.S.E. (music producer)

With Modern Rhythmic Team
2003: Desert Dance 2001 Dualisme (composer. musician, music producer)

With Women's Voice
2004: Women's Voice (music producer)

With Miriam Aziz
2007: We're Inside Out (Rock Pixie Records) (music producer)
2009: Transito (Rock Pixie Records/New Music) (music producer)

With Line Peters
 2008: Tell Me How the Story Goes (New Music) (music producer)

With Women's Voice International Music Network
2009: Dodoma (composer. musician, music producer, band leader)
 2005: "Trafficking" (composer. musician, music producer, band leader)
 2004: "Woemn's Voice" (composer. musician, music producer, band leader)

With Cuantum Force
2011: Soul Particles'' (Charles Mena) (music producer)

References

External links 
 
 Global Oslo Music
 Malika Makouf Rasmussen on YouTube

Norwegian percussionists
20th-century Norwegian composers
21st-century Norwegian composers
20th-century Norwegian multi-instrumentalists
21st-century Norwegian multi-instrumentalists
Norwegian Academy of Music alumni
1965 births
Living people
Norwegian people of Algerian descent
University of Oslo alumni
Norwegian expatriates in Hungary